Brao or BRAO may refer to:

 Brao language, a Mon–Khmer language of Cambodia and Laos
 Brao people, an ethnic minority in Cambodia and Laos
 BRAO, Branch retinal artery occlusion, a rare eye vascular disorder where a branch of the central retinal artery is obstructed

See also
 Bru (disambiguation)

Language and nationality disambiguation pages